The following is a list of the tallest buildings in Monaco.

Completed

References 

Skyscrapers in Monaco